Mount Cobbler is a mountain located in the Alpine National Park to the east of Mansfield in north-eastern Victoria, Australia. The peak and surrounding Cobbler land system are composed of sedimentary rocks (conglomerate, red sandstone, siltstone and shale), dating to the Lower Carboniferous  period, some 359 to 318 million years ago.

Nearby Lake Cobbler, which has a camping area, is accessible by a four-wheel drive track. From there is a walking track to the summit, and another to Dandongadale Falls, which drops  from the plateau and is the highest waterfall in Victoria. The  walk to the summit is moderate to steep. Surrounding peaks include Mount Typo to the north-east, Mount Koonika and Mount Speculation to the south-east, and Mount Stirling to the south-west.

Tree species occurring on the surrounding plateau include Mountain Gum (Eucalyptus dalrympleana), Snow Gum (E. pauciflora) and Broad-leaved Peppermint (E. dives). Heathland, shrubland and patches of herbfield are found on the rocky escarpments, with species including Alpine Shaggy-pea (Podolobium alpestre) and Mountain Beard-heath (Acrothamnus hookeri).

See also

 Alpine National Park
 List of mountains in Victoria

References

Mountains of Victoria (Australia)
Alpine National Park
Mountains of Hume (region)